The least developed countries (LDCs) are developing countries listed by the United Nations that exhibit the lowest indicators of socioeconomic development. The concept of LDCs originated in the late 1960s and the first group of LDCs was listed by the UN in its resolution 2768 (XXVI) on 18 November 1971.

A country is classified among the Least Developed Countries if it meets three criteria:
Poverty – adjustable criterion based on Gross national income (GNI) per capita averaged over three years. , a country must have GNI per capita less than US$1,025 to be included on the list, and over $1,230 to graduate from it.
Human resource weakness (based on indicators of nutrition, health, education and adult literacy). 
Economic vulnerability (based on instability of agricultural production, instability of exports of goods and services, economic importance of non-traditional activities, merchandise export concentration, handicap of economic smallness, and the percentage of population displaced by natural disasters).

As of December 2020, 46 countries were still classified as LDC, while six graduated between 1994 and 2020. The World Trade Organization (WTO) recognizes the UN list and says that "Measures taken in the framework of the WTO can help LDCs increase their exports to other WTO members and attract investment. In many developing countries, pro-market reforms have encouraged faster growth, diversification of exports, and more effective participation in the multilateral trading system."

Overview

LDC criteria are reviewed every three years by the Committee for Development Policy (CDP) of the UN Economic and Social Council (ECOSOC). Countries may be removed from the LDC classification when indicators exceed these criteria in two consecutive triennial reviews. The United Nations Office of the High Representative for the Least Developed Countries, Landlocked Developing Countries and Small Island Developing States (UN-OHRLLS) coordinates UN support and provides advocacy services for Least Developed Countries. The classification applies to 46 countries.

At the UN's fourth conference on LDCs, which was held in May 2011, delegates endorsed a goal targeting the promotion of at least half the current LDC countries within the next ten years. As of 2018, ten or more countries were expected to graduate in 2024, with Bangladesh and Djibouti already satisfying all criteria in 2018.

There is one country which presently meets the criteria and two countries which previously met the criteria for LDC status, but declined to be included in the index, questioning the validity or accuracy of the CDP's data: Ghana (no longer meets criteria as of 1994), Papua New Guinea (no longer meets criteria as of 2009), and Zimbabwe.

Usage and abbreviations

Least developed countries can be distinguished from developing countries, "less developed countries", "lesser developed countries", or other similar terms. 

The term "less economically developed country" (LEDC) is also used today. However, in order to avoid confusion between "least developed country" and "less economically developed country" (which may both be abbreviated as LDC), and to avoid confusion with landlocked developing country (which can be abbreviated as LLDC), "developing country" is generally used in preference to "less-developed country".

During a United Nations review in 2018, the UN defined LDCs as countries meeting three criteria, one of which was a three-year average estimate of gross national income (GNI) per capita of less than US$1,025. Countries with populations over 75 million are excluded.

UN conferences

There were five United Nations conferences on LDCs, held every ten years. The first two were in Paris, in 1981 and 1991; the third was in Brussels in 2001.

The Fourth UN Conference on Least Developed Countries (LDC-IV) was held in Istanbul, Turkey, on 9–13 May 2011. It was attended by Ban Ki-moon, the head of the UN, and close to 50 prime ministers and heads of state. The conference endorsed the goal of raising half the existing Least developed countries out of the LDC category in 2022. As with the Seoul Development Consensus drawn up in 2010, there was a strong emphasis on boosting productive capability and physical infrastructure, with several NGOs not pleased with the emphasis placed on the private sector.

Trade
Issues surrounding global trade regulations and LDCs have gained a lot of media and policy attention thanks to the recently collapsed Doha Round of World Trade Organization (WTO) negotiations being termed a development round. During the WTO's Hong Kong Ministerial, it was agreed that LDCs could see 100 percent duty-free, quota-free access to U.S. markets if the round were completed. But analysis of the deal by NGOs found that the text of the proposed LDC deal had substantial loopholes that might make the offer less than the full 100 percent access, and could even erase some current duty-free access of LDCs to rich country markets. Dissatisfaction with these loopholes led some economists to call for a reworking of the Hong Kong deal.

Dr. Chiedu Osakwe, as of 2001 the Director, Technical Cooperation Division at the Secretariat of the WTO, and adviser to the Director-General on developing country matters, was appointed as the WTO Special Coordinator for the Least Developed Countries beginning in 1999. He worked closely with the five other agencies that together with the WTO constitute the Integrated Framework of action for the Least Developed Countries. They addressed issues of market access, special and differential treatment provisions for developing countries, participation of developing countries in the multilateral trading system, and development questions, especially the interests of developing countries in competition policy.  At the 28th G8 summit in Kananaskis, Alberta, Canadian Prime Minister Jean Chrétien proposed and carried the Market Access Initiative, so that the then 48 LDCs could profit from "trade-not-aid". Additionally, the United Nations Sustainable Development Goal 14 advocates for an effective special and differential treatment of LDCs as integral parts of WTO fisheries subsidies negotiation.

List of countries 
The following 46 countries were still listed as least developed countries by the UN as of November 2021: Afghanistan, Angola, Bangladesh, Benin, Bhutan, Burkina Faso, Burundi, Cambodia, Central African Republic, Chad, Comoros, Democratic Republic of Congo, Djibouti, Eritrea, Ethiopia, Gambia, Guinea, Guinea-Bissau, Haiti, Kiribati, Laos, Lesotho, Liberia, Madagascar, Malawi, Mali, Mauritania, Mozambique, Myanmar, Nepal, Niger, Rwanda, São Tomé and Príncipe, Senegal, Sierra Leone, Solomon Islands, Somalia, South Sudan, Sudan, East Timor, Togo, Tuvalu, Uganda, Tanzania, Yemen, Zambia.

By continent or region 
There are 33 countries that are classified as least developed countries in Africa, nine in Asia, three in Oceania, and one in the Americas.

The list of "least developed countries" according to the United Nations with some that are categorized into the landlocked developing countries and the Small Island Developing States:

Africa

Americas

Asia

Oceania

Delisted countries (graduated countries) 
The three criteria (human assets, economic vulnerability and gross national income per capita) are assessed by the Committee for Development Policy every three years. Countries must meet two of the three criteria at two consecutive triennial reviews to be considered for graduation. The Committee for Development Policy sends its recommendations for endorsement to the Economic and Social Council (ECOSOC).

After the initiation of the LDC category, six countries graduated to developing country status. The first country to graduate from LDC status was Botswana in 1994. The second country was Cape Verde in 2007. Maldives graduated to developing country status on at the beginning of 2011, Samoa in 2014, Equatorial Guinea in 2017, and Vanuatu in December 2020. 

The following countries are no longer categorized in the "least developed countries" group:
 (became a state within the Republic of India in 1975)
 (graduated from LDC status in December 1994)
 (graduated in December 2007)
 (graduated in January 2011)
 (graduated in January 2014)
 (graduated in June 2017)
 (graduated in December 2020)

Countries expected to graduate soon 

 Bhutan will graduate or be upgraded in 2023. São Tomé and Príncipe and Solomon Islands will also leave the category in 2024. 
 Nepal was selected to graduate or be upgraded to developing countries in 2018. However, the authorities of Nepal requested to postpone it until 2021.  It was later pushed back an additional five years.
 Angola was expected to graduate or be upgraded in 2021, but the preparatory period was extended by three years because of the economic difficulties of the country and its dependence on commodities. 
 Bangladesh met the criteria twice, once in 2018 and again in 2021. The country will officially graduate from LDC status in November 2026, two years after it was supposed to, because of the COVID-19 pandemic. 
 Laos and Nepal will also graduate in November 2026.
 Cambodia will also graduate from LDC status in 2027.

See also

 
 
 
 
 
 
 
 
 
 
  (MDC), opposite of LDCs

References

External links
 Office of the High Representative for the Least Developed Countries, United Nations
 United Nations List of LDCs
 Criteria for Identification of LDCs
 Fourth UN Conference on the LDCs
 UNCTAD Least Developed Countries Report (Series)
 UN LDC-IV Civil Society Forum

 
Economic country classifications
Debt
International development
United Nations coalitions and unofficial groups
Measurements and definitions of poverty
Economic development